The 2016–17 SC Juventus București season ...

Players

First team squad

Transfers

Winter:

In:

Out:

Goalscorers
Last updated on 18 June 2017 (UTC)

Competitions

Liga II

League table

League results summary

League position by round

Results

Cupa României

Results

Friendlies

See also

 2016–17 Cupa României
 2016–17 Liga II

Notes and references

ASC Daco-Getica București seasons
Juventus